Sharon R. Bannister is a United States Air Force major general and dentist serving as director of medical operations of the Office of the Surgeon General of the United States Air Force. She previously served as command surgeon of Air Combat Command.

References

Year of birth missing (living people)
Living people
Place of birth missing (living people)
Miami University alumni
Case Western Reserve University alumni
American dentists
University of Texas Health Science Center at San Antonio alumni
Dwight D. Eisenhower School for National Security and Resource Strategy alumni
United States Air Force generals